Sunnyslope High School is in the Glendale Union High School District in Phoenix, Arizona and offers courses for grades 9–12.

Description
Sunnyslope was designed by the local architecture firm Edward L. Varney Associates. The construction contract to build the school was awarded to Farmer & Godfrey Construction Co.

Athletics

Recent titles
The boys' basketball team won its first state championship in 2002 and its 2nd in 2009 and were runners-up in 2010 and 2016. In 2017 and 2018, the boys' basketball team won back-to-back 5A titles under coach Ray Portela.  Additionally, the volleyball team won titles in 2017, 2014, 2013, 2011, 2010, 2009, 2008, and 2006 . The boys' and girls' swim teams won titles in 2005, with the boys winning again in 2006. Sunnyslope's girls' badminton team won the 4A state title in 2009 and the 5a title in 2016. and were runners-up in 2010.

Awards and recognition
Sunnyslope High School has been given the "Excelling" status by Arizona in accordance with the No Child Left Behind Act for eight years in a row. Sunnyslope was also named a top high school by the U.S. News & World Report

See also

References

External links
 SHS Website
 1980 Reunion
 Sunnyslope Football

high schools in Phoenix, Arizona
public high schools in Arizona